Khvajehi (also Romanized as Khvājeh’ī) is a village in Kuh Panj Rural District, in the Central District of Bardsir County, Kerman Province, Iran. At the 2006 census, its population was 25, in 8 families.

References 

Populated places in Bardsir County